Terry Dunn (born May 6, 1953) was the head men's basketball coach at Dartmouth College from 2004 through January 9, 2010, when he resigned his position.

Head coaching record

College

References

1953 births
Living people
Air Force Falcons men's basketball coaches
Army Black Knights men's basketball coaches
Basketball coaches from Colorado
Basketball players from Colorado Springs, Colorado
College men's basketball head coaches in the United States
Colorado Buffaloes men's basketball coaches
Colorado State Rams men's basketball coaches
Dartmouth Big Green men's basketball coaches
Northern Colorado Bears men's basketball players
Sportspeople from Colorado Springs, Colorado
Place of birth missing (living people)